Jammin' the Blues is a 1944 American short film made by Gjon Mili and Norman Granz in which a number of prominent jazz musicians re-create the jam-session atmosphere of nightclubs and after-hours spots. It features Lester Young, Red Callender, Harry Edison, Marlowe Morris, Sid Catlett, Barney Kessel, Jo Jones, John Simmons, Illinois Jacquet, Marie Bryant and Archie Savage.

Cast 
 Lester Young – Tenor saxophone
 Red Callender – Bass
 Harry "Sweets" Edison – Trumpet
 Marlowe Morris – Piano
 "Big" Sid Catlett – Drums (First two songs, and intro of third)
 Jo Jones – Drums (for final song)
 Barney Kessel – Guitar
 John Simmons – Double bass
 Illinois Jacquet – Tenor saxophone
 Marie Bryant – Vocals and Female Dancer
 Archie Savage – Male Dancer

Songs
 "Midnight Symphony"
 "On the Sunny Side of the Street" – Sung by Marie Bryant
 "Jammin' the Blues"

Production 
Gjon Mili and Norman Granz, who was credited as technical director, shot the film over four days with the support of Warner Bros. head of short films, Gordon Hollingshead. Barney Kessel was the only white musician in the film. His hands were stained with berry juice, and he was seated in the shadows to shade his skin.

Reception and legacy
Producer Gordon Hollingshead was nominated for an Oscar in the category of Best Short Subject, One-reel.

In 1995, Jammin' the Blues was selected for preservation in the United States National Film Registry by the Library of Congress as being "culturally, historically, or aesthetically significant".

The short was released on both DVDs of the film Blues in the Night (1941) and Passage to Marseille (1944), the latter starring Humphrey Bogart.

See also
List of American films of 1944
Swing music
Bebop

References

External links 
 
Jammin’ the Blues essay by Daniel Eagan in America's Film Legacy: The Authoritative Guide to the Landmark Movies in the National Film Registry, A&C Black, 2010 , pages 374-375 

1944 films
1944 short films
American short films
United States National Film Registry films
Jazz films
Warner Bros. short films
1940s English-language films